Corrimony is a small village at the western end of Glenurquhart, in Inverness-shire, in the Highlands of Scotland, now within Highland council area. It is 13 km west of Drumnadrochit, and 32 km south-west of Inverness.

Corrimony is famous for Mony's Stone and Corrimony Chambered Cairn. The chambered cairn is part of the Clava group of cairns, dating back 4,000 years. The cairn is surrounded by 11 standing stones.

The River Enrick passes Corrimony, before flowing down Glenurquhart to Loch Ness. The river flows over Corrimony Falls, a waterfall to the south of the settlement.

An upland area to the south is owned by the RSPB, and run as Corrimony nature reserve. The site covers 1531 ha, and was acquired by the RSPB in 1997. The RSPB are working to restore Caledonian Forest, for the benefit of Black Grouse.

Further reading
 David Lynn, The Corrimony estate – a summary of its history and sites from the 1800s until today, November 2008.  Via Highland Council website.

See also
Balbeg
Balnain

References

Populated places in Inverness committee area
Royal Society for the Protection of Birds reserves in Scotland
Neolithic Scotland
Chambered cairns in Scotland
Scheduled monuments in Scotland